Paano ang Puso Ko? is a 1997 Filipino romantic comedy film directed by Rory B. Quintos and starring Judy Ann Santos, Wowie De Guzman, and Rico Yan. The film, produced and distributed by Star Cinema, premiered in the Philippines on February 12, 1997.

Plot
Ruben (Wowie De Guzman) and Cecile (Judy Ann Santos) are childhood friends. One day, Ruben's cousin Jason (Rico Yan), returns from the United States. He meets Cecile and despite their different backgrounds, the two fall in love. Only then does Ruben realize that he too is in love with Cecile. However, Jason has a secret that may destroy his relationship with Cecile and Ruben.

As time passes, Jason admits his love for Cecile and the two become a couple. However, Ruben also plans to state his love for Cecile and brings her a flower as a statement of his love. Cecile says that she is in a relationship with Jason and Ruben is disappointed; the two cousins have a fight.

Cecile's father does not like Jason, and thus physically attacks him. Jason is traumatized and falls ill, then secretly leaves the Philippines, knowing that he can die of his illness at any moment. Months later, Jason returns, only to die shortly afterwards. After Jason's death, Ruben and Cecile become a couple.

Full cast and characters

Main cast
 Judy Ann Santos as Cecille
 Wowie De Guzman as Ruben
 Rico Yan as Jason

Supporting cast

Production

Filming locations
Filming took place primarily within the province of Batangas in the Philippines. In specific, they captured the countryside in Laurel and Tanauan provinces. The team had to show farmlands and people plowing on the field where the characters Cecille and Ruben were born. The production crew also filmed at the Enchanted Kingdom amusement park in Santa Rosa, Laguna, where the characters Cecille and Jason visit and date in the film.

Music
The film's titular theme song "Paano ang Puso Ko" was penned by Roberto Rigor and performed by April Boy Regino. The song was adapted from Chuck Willis' "What Am I Living For", composed by Fred Jay and Art Harris.

Reception

Box office
Before the film's release, the pairing of Santos and de Guzman was proven to be successful for audiences. Paano Ang Puso Ko? marked the sixth time (including minor roles) they had partnered in a film after the success of their first team-up in ABS-CBN's longest soap opera Mara Clara, which ended on February 14 (Valentine's Day, two days after the movie was released) and later the premiering of Esperanza on February 17 the following week. In addition, de Guzman was already popular during that time as a performer of Universal Motion Dancers (UMD), a dancing group in the Philippines. It also marks Yan's first film role with Santos after working together in the teen drama series Gimik. Nevertheless, their combination was also popular during that time. The film was a box-office success.

Critical response
Aside from its commercial success, the film received favorable reviews. Leah Castaneda of the Manila Standard newspaper noted:
I like Judy Ann when she was still in her Wowie de Guzman/Rico Yan phase. I watched her movies and thought, 'Now, here's a good actress'. Her being natural and effortless impressed me. She was convincing in her roles as an unassuming probinsyana gifted with a golden heart and impeccable comedic timing. I enjoyed how she seemed to forever irritate Wowie and how she managed to capture Rico's heart, if only on the silver screen...

Awards

References

External links
 
 

1997 films
Star Cinema films
Philippine romantic comedy films
Filipino-language films
Films directed by Rory Quintos